Irina (?-990), was a Grand Princess of the Kiev by marriage to Vladimir the Great, Grand Prince of Kiev (r. 980–1015).

Issue
 Sviatopolk the Accursed (born c. 979), possibly the surviving son of Yaropolk

References

Year of birth unknown
Date of death unknown
Kievan Rus' princesses
10th-century Rus' women